The Good Wife and its spin-off, The Good Fight, are American legal and political television series produced for CBS and CBS' streaming service CBS All Access respectively, created by Robert and Michelle King. The Good Wife follows the political, professional, and personal life of Alicia Florrick (Julianna Margulies), a political "good wife" who is thrust back into the workplace after over a decade after her husband, Peter Florrick (Chris Noth), a local Chicago politician, is arrested on corruption charges following a highly publicized sex scandal. The Good Fight follows Alicia's former colleagues Diane Lockhart (Christine Baranski) and Lucca Quinn (Cush Jumbo) contending with political and legal challenges in a new political environment as they continue their careers at a left-wing, African American–owned law firm.

Main cast
List indicators
  = Main cast (credited) 
  = Recurring cast (4+)
  = Guest cast (1-3)

Recurring cast

Guest cast

References

 
Good Wife